Tragic Serenades is an EP by the Swiss extreme metal band Celtic Frost. It was released in 1986 and was an influence on the developing death metal and black metal genres. According to frontman Thomas Gabriel Fischer, the purpose of this EP was to include Martin Eric Ain's bass lines and improve on Horst Müller's original production of tracks from To Mega Therion.

The EP was reissued in 2018, with 2,500 copies pressed for Record Store Day 2018.

Overview 
The re-recorded version of "Return to the Eve" (the original version of which was featured on the Morbid Tales album) features Reed's habit of loudly goofing off during songs, with Reed loosely sharing lead vocals. Celtic Frost included this "party-like studio jam" of the song on Tragic Serenades as their "first public display of light-heartedness".

Track listing

Personnel 
Celtic Frost
Thomas G. Warrior – vocals, guitar, effects, producer
Martin Ain – bass, effects, producer
Reed St. Mark – drums, percussion, effects

Production
Horst Müller – engineer (original recordings)
Harris Johns – engineer (new recordings)
Karl "Jeder Will 1500" Walterbach – executive producer

References

References 

Celtic Frost albums
1986 EPs
Noise Records EPs
Black metal EPs